Sclerochiton preussii is a species of plant in the family Acanthaceae. It is found in Cameroon and Nigeria. Its natural habitat is subtropical or tropical moist lowland forests.

References

Acanthaceae
Endangered plants
Taxonomy articles created by Polbot